Gjensidige Forsikring ASA is a Norwegian insurance company. The company traces its roots back to 1816 when a fire mutual was founded as Land Gjensidige Brandkasse in what is today Innlandet county. Gjensidige demutualised and listed on the Oslo Stock Exchange in December 2010. The firm, headquartered in Oslo, has a market share of some 26% (2021) in the Norwegian insurance market. The company has 36 branch offices in Norway, not including affiliated fire mutuals, and 1 million customers. Gjensidige has subsidiaries in Denmark, Sweden and The Baltics.

The company offers all kinds of insurance for retail customers, agriculture and business. It also offers pensions and savings products.

History
Although the company traces its roots back to 1816, the brand name Gjensidige originates from the  life insurance company Christiania almindelige gjensidige forsørgelsesanstalt that was established in 1847. In the early 1970s the p&c-company traded under the name Samtrygd, whereas the life insurance company had simplified its name to Gjensidige Liv. The two companies formed a strategic alliance in 1976, adopting Gjensidige as a joint brand name, but as both companies were mutually owned they did not merge.

In 1992 Gjensidige acquired Forenede Forsikring and in 1993 Gjensidige Bank was created with banking services. In 1999 Gjensidige and the savings bank Sparebanken NOR created the Gjensidige NOR-group. The Group was a strategic alliance between mutually owned companies. When Gjensidige NOR merged with Den norske Bank in 2003 to form DnB NOR, Gjensidige Forsikring remained an independent company.

In 2007 Gjensidige acquired shares in Storebrand, and for some time held the position as the number one shareholder with 24.33% of the stock. The entire shareholding was sold in 2014.

In 2010 Gjensidige demutualised and was listed on the Oslo Stock Exchange. The Gjensidige Foundation is the largest owner with some 62 percent of the shares.

See also

 List of oldest companies

References

 https://www.gjensidige.no/group/annual-report

External links 
 
 Lithuanian branch
 Denmark branch
 Latvian branch
 Estonian branch

Financial services companies of Norway
Mutual insurance companies
Cooperatives in Norway
Norwegian companies established in 1923
Financial services companies established in 1923
Companies based in Oslo
Companies listed on the Oslo Stock Exchange